Northwest Classen High School is a public high school serving students in grades 9–12 in Oklahoma City, Oklahoma.

History 
Northwest Classen High School was built in 1955 to accommodate the growing population in the northwest corridor of Oklahoma City.  Along with Classen School of Advanced Studies, it was named for Anton H. Classen, an early Oklahoma City real estate developer and philanthropist.

As the neighborhoods around Northwest Classen have changed, so has the cultural makeup of the campus.  Initially an almost all-Caucasian school, the population has gradually become more multi-cultural.  Today, the enrollment in the school is predominantly Hispanic with about 1/2 as many African-American and 1/4 Caucasian students with almost 100 different races and cultures represented.

Hudson Performance Hall 
The original auditorium was, along with the rest of the school, targeted for upgrades and renovation as part of Oklahoma City's "MAPS for Kids" program in 2010.  Alumni J. Clifford Hudson (a local businessman) and his wife Leslie, who had met in that auditorium, donated $500,000 in additional funds to install updated sound and lighting technology, improve the acoustics and update the audience area for the site.  Now named the "Hudson Performance Hall", the venue has held concerts by notable acts such as Vince Gill (also an alumni), Al Yankovic, Arlo Guthrie, and Sinbad.

Extracurricular activities 
Northwest fields teams in Oklahoma Secondary School Activities Association-sanctioned competition in baseball, fast-pitch softball, football, cheerleading, cross country, volleyball, basketball, tennis, wrestling, golf, soccer, and track.

Northwest is host to an active JROTC (Army) program.  Clubs include a chess club, multicultural club, history club, native-American student services club, Anime club, and a dance team.

Notable alumni 

 William A. Martin (Class of 1956) – Computer Scientist, Artificial Intelligence Pioneer
 Edward Ruscha (Class of 1956) – Artist
 Mason Williams (Class of 1956) – Recording Artist
 Susanna Talley Clark (Class of 1957) – Songwriter, artist and wife of Guy Clark
 Henson Cargill (Class of 1959) – Recording Artist
 Gary Nixon (Class of 1959) - Professional motorcycle racer, AMA Grand National Champion (1967 and 1968), member of AMA Motorcycle Hall of Fame and Motorsports Hall of Fame of America.
 Ron Norick (Class of 1959) – Former mayor of Oklahoma City
 Jerry C. Elliott High Eagle (Class of 1961) - Physicist and engineer.  Recipient of Presidential Medal of Freedom
 Ronald Fagin (Class of 1963) – Computer Scientist, Author of Fagin's theorem
 Steven T. Kuykendall (Class of 1965) - Member, US House of Representatives, California's 36th congressional district from 1991 to 2001.
 Elizabeth (Herring) Warren (Class of 1966) – United States Senator from Massachusetts, Democratic Party presidential candidate. Special Advisor to U.S. Treasury Secretary Timothy Geithner while establishing the Consumer Financial Protection Bureau. Professor, Harvard Law School.
 Kirk Humphreys (Class of 1968) – Former Mayor of Oklahoma City
 Skip Bayless (Class of 1970) – Sports Broadcaster
 Rick Bayless (Class of 1971) -- Chef and restaurateur
 J. Clifford Hudson (Class of 1973) – Chairman and Chief Executive Officer of Sonic Corp.
 Vince Gill (Class of 1975) – Recording Artist
 Sean O'Grady (Class of 1977) – World Boxing Association Lightweight
 Walter Emery Fountain (Class of 1980) - Major General, United States Army
 Kevin Thornton (Class of 1987) – Recording Artist (member of Color Me Badd)
 Bryan Abrams (Class of 1988) – Recording Artist (member of Color Me Badd)
 Mark Calderon (Class of 1988) – Recording Artist (member of Color Me Badd)
 Sam Watters (Class of 1988) – Recording Artist (member of Color Me Badd)
 Jabee Williams (Class of 2001) - Recording Artist
 Darnell Jackson (Class of 2003, transferred) – Former NBA Basketball Player

Order of the Round Table Hall of Fame
In 2018, the Friends of NWC High School Foundation instituted a Hall of Fame with annual inductions.
 James R Daniel (class of 1958, inducted 2018) - Vice Chairman, BancFirst Corporation
 Dayna Davis Savage (Class of 1957, inducted 2018) - Leader, The Gathering Place, a memory care ministry in Houston, Texas
 Cliff Hudson (Class of 1973, inducted 2018) - Chairman, Sonic Corporation; Chairman, Oklahoma City School Board (2001-2008)
 Ron Norick (Class of 1959, inducted 2018) - Mayor, Oklahoma City (1987-1998)
 Vince Gill (Class of 1975, inducted 2018) - Recording artist

2019 Inductees were:
 Skip Bayless (Class of 1970) - Sports columnist and television personality
 John D. (Denny) Carreker (Class of 1960) - Entrepreneur, Chairman and CEO of Carreker Corporation
 Jerry C. Elliott (Class of 1961) - Physicist and engineer.  Recipient of Presidential Medal of Freedom for his role in the recovery of the Apollo 13 astronauts.
 Lynne Hardin (Class of 1964) - Author of The Magic of Why and former Chair of the Oklahoma City Public School Board.
 Mason Williams (Class of 1956) - Musician, composer, comedian, comedy writer.  Winner of both Grammy and Emmy awards.

References

External links
 Official website
 District site
 Facebook Page (Created by Alumni)

Educational institutions established in 1955
Public high schools in Oklahoma
Schools in Oklahoma City
Northwest Classen High School alumni
1955 establishments in Oklahoma